Women's 10 metre platform event at the 2019 European Diving Championships was contested on 6 August.

Results
19 athletes participated at the event; the best 12 from the Preliminary round qualified for the Final.

Preliminary round

Final

References

W